The Y-50 Cable (also known as the Dunwoodie–Glenwood Line) is an undersea and underground high voltage electric transmission cable between Westchester County and Long Island via the Long Island Sound and Hempstead Harbor in New York, United States.

Description 
The Y-50 Cable travels between the Dunwoodie Substation in Yonkers, Westchester County to the Glenwood Generating Station in Glenwood Landing, Nassau County. It travels under the Long Island Sound between Westchester County and Long Island.

Y-50 is one of five undersea transmission lines connecting between Long Island and the Continental United States as of 2021 (four of which are operated by NYPA).  The line delivers power to both Long Island Power Authority and Consolidated Edison.

History 
The cable began operating in 1978.

In 2002, the cable experienced a fault that caused a month-and-a-half interruption, after which the operators lowered its usage from its 600 MW capacity down to 400 MW for a few months.  It experienced another fault in 2021, at which point it had a 656 MW capacity.

See also 

 Cross Sound Cable
 Y-49 Cable

References 

Long Island Sound
Energy infrastructure completed in 1978
Energy infrastructure on Long Island, New York